Church of St. Peter and Paul is a Roman Catholic church with a monastery in Mostar. It is located along the river Radobolja, at the foot of Hum. The church is run by the Franciscans.

History
The conditions for the construction of this church were created only by the weakening of Ottoman power, the easing of discipline and the reforms of the Ottoman Empire. After the bishop's residence complex was built in Vukodol in 1847, the seat of the new Franciscan province and the seat of the bishop of Mostar, in 1866 the Franciscan church of St. Peter and Paul in the city itself. Thirty years later, a Franciscan monastery was built. The church was destroyed in the Serb-Montenegrin shelling of Mostar in 1992. It was rebuilt after the war. The church has the tallest bell tower in Bosnia and Herzegovina (107 meters). It is also the tallest bell tower in southeast Europe.

Gallery

References

Roman Catholic churches completed in 1999
Buildings and structures in Mostar
1866 establishments in Europe
20th-century Roman Catholic church buildings in Bosnia and Herzegovina